People's Square is a large public square in the Huangpu District of Shanghai. It is south of Nanjing Road (West) and north of Huaihai Road (East).

People's Square is the site of Shanghai's municipal government headquarters building and the standard reference point for measurement of distance of almost all highways in the Shanghai municipality is set in the north of the square, near the fountain.

History
Prior to 1949 and the establishment of the People's Republic of China, what is now People's Square was a course for horse racing owned by the Shanghai Race Club. Gambling and horse racing ceased during World War II and was not permitted to re-commence by the Republic of China government after the war. After the Chinese Civil War, the new Communist government continued the ban and, when the club ran into financial difficulties, took over the grounds and a part of the race course became People's Square, which included a large avenue and spectator stands for use during parades.

In the 1990s, major changes were made to the square. The Shanghai Municipal Government was moved here from the former HSBC Building on the Bund, also the Shanghai Museum was moved here from its previous site in a former office building. More recent additions include the Shanghai Grand Theatre and the Shanghai Urban Planning Exhibition Hall.

Other parts of the race course still remain. The clubhouse buildings became the Shanghai Art Museum, while part of the race track became People's Park, a public park.

Landmarks
Well-known landmarks and tourist attractions surrounding the square include:

 Grand Cinema
 K11, formerly known as the Hong Kong New World Tower
 Municipal government headquarters
 Nanjing Road
 Park Hotel Shanghai (tallest building in Asia, 1934–1952)
 People's Park
 Radisson Blu Hotel Shanghai New World
 Raffles City Shanghai
 Shanghai Grand Theatre
 Shanghai Museum
 Shanghai Art Museum
 Shanghai Urban Planning Exhibition Center
 Shimao International Plaza
 Tomorrow Square
 Madame Tussauds Shanghai

The Shanghai Museum is in a prominent central position in the square, with large fountains immediately to the north.

Transportation

The Shanghai Metro's People's Square Subway Station is an interchange among the subway's Line 1, Line 2, and Line 8. Several bus stops also ring the north and south sides of the square.

See also

 People's Park

References

External links

 Apr. 2007 Sept. 2007 Oct. 2007 Jan. 2008 YouTube videos

Squares in Shanghai
Tourist attractions in Shanghai
Huangpu District, Shanghai